Roderick "Rod" Johnson is an Australian computer specialist who created the Spring Framework and co-founded SpringSource, where he served as CEO until its 2009 acquisition by VMware. In 2011, Johnson became Chairman of Neo4j's Board of Directors. At the JavaOne 2012 it was announced that he joined the Typesafe Inc. Company board of directors. In 2016, he founded Atomist.

Biography 

Johnson studied at the University of Sydney, graduating in 1992 with a BA Hons (music and computer science). In 1996 he completed a PhD in musicology, also at Sydney, with a thesis entitled 'Piano music in Paris under the July monarchy (1830-1848)'.

Working between Sydney and San Francisco, Johnson currently serves on the board of four corporations:
 Neo Technology
 Atomist
 Meteor
 Hazelcast

Publications 

 2002. Expert One-on-One J2EE Design and Development. Wrox. .
 2004. Expert One-on-One J2EE Development without EJB. Wrox. .
 2005. Professional Java Development with the Spring Framework. With Juergen Hoeller, Alef Arendsen, Thomas Risberg and Colin Sampaleanu. Wrox. .

References

Living people
Australian computer scientists
Year of birth missing (living people)